Cape Page is a cape lying 13 nautical miles (24 km) southwest of Cape Kater on the west coast of Graham Land, and forming the west side of the entrance to Vinitsa Cove. Roughly shown by the Swedish Antarctic Expedition under Nordenskjold, 1901–04. Photographed by Hunting Aerosurveys Ltd. in 1955-57 and mapped from these photos by the Falkland Islands Dependencies Survey (FIDS). Named by the United Kingdom Antarctic Place-Names Committee (UK-APC) in 1960 for Sir Frederick H. Page, pioneer aircraft designer and president of the Royal Aeronautical Society, 1945–47.

Handley Page
Headlands of Graham Land
Davis Coast